The 2021 Tulsa Golden Hurricane football team represented the University of Tulsa as a member of the American Athletic Conference during the 2021 NCAA Division I FBS football season.  Led by seventh-year head coach Philip Montgomery, the Golden Hurricane compiled an overall record of 7–6 with a mark of 5–3 in conference play, placing in a three-way tie for third in the American. Tulsa was invited to the Myrtle Beach Bowl, where they beat Old Dominion. The team played home games at Skelly Field at H. A. Chapman Stadium in Tulsa, Oklahoma.

Preseason

American Athletic Conference preseason media poll
The American Athletic Conference preseason media poll was released at the virtual media day held August 4, 2021. Cincinnati, who finished the 2020 season ranked No. 8 nationally, was tabbed as the preseason favorite in the 2021 preseason media poll.

Schedule
Tulsa opened the 2021 season at home against UC Davis on Thursday, September 2, before a pair of road games at Oklahoma State, September 11 in Stillwater and Ohio State, September 18 in Columbus.

Rankings

Roster

References

Tulsa
Tulsa Golden Hurricane football seasons
Myrtle Beach Bowl champion seasons
Tulsa Golden Hurricane football